The Tốn line (Hán tự: 支巽; chi can also be translated to as branch) was the fifth dynasty of Hùng kings of the Hồng Bàng period of Văn Lang (now Viet Nam). Starting approximately 1912 B.C., the line refers to the rule of Viên Lang and his successors, when the seat of government was centered at Phú Thọ.

History
Viên Lang was born approximately 1970 B.C., and took the regnal name of Hùng Hy Vương (雄牺王) upon becoming Hùng king. The series of all Hùng kings following Viên Lang took that same regnal name of Hùng Hy Vương to rule over Văn Lang until approximately 1713 B.C.

References

Bibliography
Nguyễn Khắc Thuần (2008). Thế thứ các triều vua Việt Nam. Giáo Dục Publisher.

Ancient peoples
Hồng Bàng dynasty
18th-century BC disestablishments
20th-century BC establishments